Albert Rosen (May 9, 1910 – August 2, 1990) was an American actor. He is known for his recurring role of "Al" in the television sitcom Cheers.

Biography
Rosen was born in Maryland. He acted in several films in the 1940s, then in the 1970s was a production supervisor on the TV show What's My Line?. Again in the 1980s, he acted in television series and films in minor roles, including the recurring character "Al" (or "Big Al") in the sitcom Cheers and the cafeteria concession stand attendant in the sitcom Night Court.

According to Gilbert Gottfried's Amazing Colossal Podcast with James Burrows, airing on September 9, 2019, Al was also a stunt man for the Three Stooges.

Death
He died of cancer in Hollywood, California at the age of 80.

Season 9, episode 10 of Cheers ("Norm and Cliff's Excellent Adventure") is dedicated to Rosen with "to our friend Al Rosen" shown during the credits.

Filmography
 Footlight Fever (1941)
 Uncivil War Birds (1946)
 Without Reservations (1946)
 Ain't Love Cuckoo? (1946)
 The Stratton Story (1949)
 What's My Line? (1941) (production manager)
 Oh, God! Book II (1980)
 L.A. Law (1988)
 Cheers (1983-1989) (74 episodes)

References

External links

1910 births
1990 deaths
Male actors from Maryland
American male film actors
American male television actors
American stunt performers
Deaths from cancer in California
20th-century American male actors